Courcelles-le-Roi (before 2018: Courcelles) is a commune in the Loiret department in north-central France.

See also
Communes of the Loiret department

References

Communes of Loiret